Wyl, or WYL, may refer to:

 Wyl Menmuir (1979–), author of the novel The Many, longlisted for the 2016 Man Booker Prize
 WYL, the National Rail code for Wylde Green railway station in the West Midlands, UK
 Luzia von Wyl (born 1985), Swiss pianist and composer

See also